Rodrigo Miguel Forte Paes Martins (born 15 September 1998) is a Portuguese professional footballer who plays for Estoril as a forward.

Football career
On 21 July 2018, Martins made his professional debut with Cova da Piedade in a 2018–19 Taça da Liga match against Varzim. In January 2020, Martins moved to Sporting da Covilhã where he made six appearances. He left the club on 16 July 2020 to join C.D. Mafra.

References

External links

1998 births
Living people
Sportspeople from Faro District
People from Faro, Portugal
Portuguese footballers
Association football forwards
Segunda Divisão players
C.F. Os Belenenses players
G.D. Estoril Praia players
C.D. Cova da Piedade players
S.C. Covilhã players
C.D. Mafra players
Campeonato de Portugal (league) players
Liga Portugal 2 players
Primeira Liga players